Malarndirri Barbara McCarthy (born 19 April 1970) is an Australian politician and former journalist who has been a Senator for the Northern Territory since 2016. She is an Assistant Minister in the Albanese Government, and previously served in the Northern Territory Legislative Assembly. 

In 2005, McCarthy was elected to the NT Legislative Assembly for the division of Arnhem. She was re-elected unopposed in 2008, and was subsequently appointed to the ministry by Paul Henderson. She held a number of portfolios over the following four years, but lost her seat in Labor's landslide defeat at the 2012 election. McCarthy subsequently returned to the media as a presenter for NITV and SBS News. She re-entered politics as Labor's lead Senate candidate in the Northern Territory at the 2016 federal election.

Background and early years
Barbara McCarthy was born in Katherine, Northern Territory, the daughter of Limandabina Charlie and John McCarthy. Through her mother, she is descended from the Garrwa and Yanyuwa peoples, whose traditional lands straddle the McArthur River and the Gulf of Carpentaria. Her father, originally from Sydney, is descended from an Irishman who arrived in Australia in 1842.

McCarthy was raised with her mother in Borroloola, on the McArthur River. She boarded in Alice Springs and at St Scholastica's College, Sydney, where she was school captain in 1988. McCarthy is a former Australian Broadcasting Corporation newsreader and journalist who began her cadetship in 1989 and worked across Australia as a news and current affairs television and radio reporter. In 1993, after a trial run at presenting the late news from Sydney, she was appointed as weeknight newsreader for ABC News in Darwin. She co-established Borroloola's first community radio station, B102.9FM-The Voice of the Gulf, in 1998, with assistance from the ABC, and also set up the Lijakarda Cultural Festivals & Media, Arts & Training Centre for Yanyuwa, Kudanji, Garrawa & Mara people from Borroloola.

Career

Early political career
In 2005, McCarthy was preselected as the Labor candidate in Arnhem to replace the retiring member Jack Ah Kit. Considered by many political pundits as a star recruit for Chief Minister Clare Martin and the Australian Labor Party, she received 73.9% of the two-party preferred vote, a 12.5% increase on Ah Kit's result. As a result of her election, McCarthy became one of ten women in the 25 seat assembly, considered at the time to be in the top 10 in the world in male to female ratio in a parliament.

|}

McCarthy was one of five indigenous candidates elected, properly reflecting the population ratio of indigenous people in the Territory. Her first term was highlighted by crossing the floor, with two other ALP members, to vote against the government's decision to divert the McArthur River to allow more mining developments, on spiritually cultural and environmental grounds, in her home country of Borroloola.

In August 2007 on the sudden death of her mother, who had been a strong advocate for the Borroloola people's struggle for land rights, linguistic and cultural parity, and who despaired at the river diversion, McCarthy added her Yanyuwa name of Malarndirri, out of cultural respect for her mother.

She was re-elected unopposed in the 2008 election. Immediately following her re-election, McCarthy was promoted to the ministry and from August 2008– November 2009 was the Minister for Children and Families, Child Protection, Statehood, Women's Policy, Senior Territorians, Young Territorians and the Minister Assisting the Chief Minister on Multicultural Affairs.

In December 2009, a Cabinet re-shuffle took place as a result of a Labor Cabinet Minister leaving the NT Labor Government and was not replaced in the Cabinet. McCarthy's portfolios then doubled and she was tasked to implement major reforms in the areas of Local Government, Regional Economic Development & Indigenous Development, while keeping the Women's & Statehood portfolio, Tourism was also added to her brief. At the 2012 election McCarthy was defeated by Country Liberal Party challenger Larisa Lee amid Labor's collapse in the remote portions of the Territory.

Interim years
McCarthy won the 2013 Journalism Story of the Year Deadly Award for her story on two  Noongar brothers, the Thorne Brothers, who were in Saudi Arabia. Shayden Thorne had been arrested on terrorism charges in Riyadh, while his brother Junaid was in hiding after protesting his brother's innocence. Both Shayden and Junaid returned to their families in Perth.

McCarthy also was a member of the National Indigenous Television (NITV) team's Walkley Awards nomination in 2014 for the Innocence Betrayed documentary based on the Bowraville murders investigation. In 2013 she received two Walkley nominations for her story on Mercedes-Benz that filmed its advertisement on Wave Rock in Western Australia, a place of deep cultural significance to Aboriginal custodians. The general manager of Mercedes-Benz flew to Wave Rock to personally apologise to custodians.

McCarthy was a journalist and presenter at SBS/NITV News and presented NITV News Week in Review on SBS1 2.30 pm on Fridays and on NITV on the weekend. In addition she worked part-time at Saint Ignatius' College, Riverview and assisted the development of the First Nations' Unit program and taught a cross cultural program at the Catholic school.

Federal politics
Following the resignation of Nova Peris, McCarthy was invited by Labor to nominate as a candidate for the Senate at the 2016 federal election, representing the Northern Territory. She was subsequently endorsed as the Labor candidate despite not being enrolled to vote in the Northern Territory. McCarthy went on to win a Senate seat at the 2 July 2016 federal election bringing a much higher primary vote and a swing of nearly 7 points to the Australian Labor Party.

Family
McCarthy has two adult sons.

References

1970 births
Living people
Indigenous Australian politicians
Labor Left politicians
Australian people of Irish descent
Australian Roman Catholics
Australian Labor Party members of the Parliament of Australia
Women members of the Australian Senate
Members of the Australian Senate
Members of the Australian Senate for the Northern Territory
Australian Labor Party members of the Northern Territory Legislative Assembly
Members of the Northern Territory Legislative Assembly
Australian television journalists
ABC News (Australia) presenters
21st-century Australian politicians
21st-century Australian women politicians
Women members of the Northern Territory Legislative Assembly
Australian women television journalists